Ōmiya, Omiya, Oomiya or Ohmiya (written: 大宮, 近江谷 or おおみや in hiragana) is a Japanese surname. Notable people with the surname include:

, Japanese curler
, Japanese cyclist
, Japanese voice actor and actor
, Japanese curler and curling coach

Oumiya (written: 近江屋 or おうみや in hiragana) is a separate surname, though it can be romanized the same way. Notable people with the surname include:

, Japanese politician

Japanese-language surnames